Odon is a town in Madison Township, Daviess County, Indiana, United States. The population was 1,354 at the 2010 census.

History
Odon was originally called Clarksburg, and under the latter name was laid out in 1846. In 1880 the name was changed to Odon. Odon was incorporated in 1885.

Geography
Odon is located at  (38.841462, -86.991148).

Demographics

2010 census
As of the census of 2010, there were 1,354 people, 603 households, and 347 families living in the town. The racial makeup of the town was 98.3% White, 0.6% Native American, 0.3% Asian, and 0.8% from two or more races. Hispanic or Latino of any race were 0.3% of the population.

There were 603 households, of which 27.7% had children under the age of 18 living with them, 41.3% were married couples living together, 13.3% had a female householder with no husband present, 3.0% had a male householder with no wife present, and 42.5% were non-families. 39.8% of all households were made up of individuals, and 23.1% had someone living alone who was 65 years of age or older. The average household size was 2.18 and the average family size was 2.89.

The median age in the town was 45.1 years. 23.8% of residents were under the age of 18; 5.5% were between the ages of 18 and 24; 20.4% were from 25 to 44; 26.2% were from 45 to 64; and 24% were 65 years of age or older. The gender makeup of the town was 45.6% male and 54.4% female.

2000 census
As of the census of 2000, there were 1,376 people, 601 households, and 378 families living in the town. The racial makeup of the town was 98.62% White, 0.15% African American, 0.44% Native American, 0.36% Asian, 0.15% from other races, and 0.29% from two or more races. Hispanic or Latino of any race were 0.87% of the population.

There were 601 households, out of which 25.5% had children under the age of 18 living with them, 50.9% were married couples living together, 9.3% had a female householder with no husband present, and 37.1% were non-families. 35.3% of all households were made up of individuals, and 19.3% had someone living alone who was 65 years of age or older. The average household size was 2.21 and the average family size was 2.87.

In the town, the population was spread out, with 21.9% under the age of 18, 6.8% from 18 to 24, 24.3% from 25 to 44, 23.3% from 45 to 64, and 23.7% who were 65 years of age or older. The median age was 43 years. For every 100 females, there were 89.5 males. For every 100 females age 18 and over, there were 80.4 males.

The median income for a household in the town was $34,667, and the median income for a family was $42,813. Males had a median income of $31,438 versus $20,833 for females. The per capita income for the town was $20,020. About 8.7% of families and 11.1% of the population were below the poverty line, including 18.1% of those under age 18 and 9.0% of those age 65 or over.

Education
Odon is served by the North Daviess Junior-Senior High School.

The town has a free lending library, the Odon Winkelpleck Public Library.

Notable people
 Joe Dawson (racing driver) - winner of second Indianapolis 500
 Herb Henderson - football player, coach, and official. Became the 86th inductee to the Indiana Football Hall of Fame on November 30, 1979.
 John Poindexter - National Security Advisor in 1985 and director of DARPA for much of 2003. Convicted of multiple felonies in the Iran–Contra affair, convictions were reversed upon appeal.
 Frank Douglas Garrett (born 1944) - university dean, speaker, author, All Marine Basketball 1964–66, JUCO All American Basketball, 1967–69; honored by town of Odon at Old Settler's 2006

References

Communities of Southwestern Indiana
Towns in Daviess County, Indiana
Towns in Indiana
1880 establishments in Indiana
Populated places established in 1880